Newmore is a brand of cigarettes, currently owned by British American Tobacco and manufactured through its subsidiary House of Prince.

History
Newmore was launched in 2002, and Newmore White was brought onto the market in 2003. The brand is available in four variants and the cigarette is 84 mm long. The tobacco mixture used in the Newmore cigarettes consists out of an American blend. The highest price is 42 Swedish krona per pack. The symbol on the Newmore packs is a fox.

See also

 Tobacco smoking

References

British American Tobacco brands